This is a list of Scottish football transfers featuring at least one 2012–13 Scottish Premier League club or one 2012–13 Scottish First Division club which were completed after the end of the summer 2012 transfer window and before the end of the 2012–13 season.

September 2012 – May 2013

See also
 List of Scottish football transfers summer 2012
 List of Scottish football transfers summer 2013

Notes

References

Transfers
Scottish
2012 in Scottish sport
2012 winter